Sarasa B.A. is a 1965 Indian Tamil-language film directed by D. Yoganand and written by Valampuri Somanathan. The film stars P. Bhanumathi and K. Balaji, with M. R. Radha, Nagesh and M. R. R. Vasu in supporting roles. It was released on 9 July 1965.

Plot

Cast 
 P. Bhanumathi as Sarasa
 K. Balaji
 M. R. Radha
 Nagesh
 M. R. R. Vasu

Soundtrack 
The music was composed by Vedha, with lyrics by Kannadasan.

Release and reception 
Sarasa B.A. was released on 9 July 1965. The Indian Express called the story "topsyturvy", adding, "Bhanumati and Balaji do manage to inject some life into the drab proceedings and Malli Irani's camerawork does show enterprise in many sequences. But what can they do when everything else about the film smacks of mediocrity?". Kalki also gave the film an unfavourable review, but said Bhanumathi's performance gave the story some dignity.

References

External links 
 

1960s Tamil-language films
Films directed by D. Yoganand
Films scored by Vedha (composer)